UFC 98: Evans vs. Machida was a mixed martial arts event held by the Ultimate Fighting Championship (UFC) on May 23, 2009 in Las Vegas, Nevada.

Background
A title unification match between the Interim UFC Heavyweight Champion Frank Mir and UFC Heavyweight Champion Brock Lesnar was originally slated to be the main event, but was postponed until UFC 100 due to a knee injury to Mir.

By way of replacement, Quinton Jackson, former UFC Light Heavyweight champion, was to fight the undefeated current champion Rashad Evans but had to undergo arthroscopic surgery to repair ligament damage in his jaw that he received in a previous training camp. Instead, Evans headlined the card against fellow undefeated contender Lyoto Machida.

The card featured the long anticipated grudge match between The Ultimate Fighter 6 coaches Matt Hughes and Matt Serra.

Due to injury, Josh Koscheck was not able to participate on this card. Brock Larson stepped in as the new opponent for Chris Wilson. Chris Wilson was unable to complete the necessary medical paperwork in order to compete at the event and was replaced by Mike Pyle.

James Irvin was set to make his Middleweight debut against Drew McFedries, but was not able to fight due to a knee injury. Xavier Foupa-Pokam stepped in to fight McFedries.

Yushin Okami was set to fight Dan Miller on the main card but was taken off the card after Okami suffered a torn ligament. Early reports suggested Ed Herman would replace Okami, however Chael Sonnen stepped in to take the bout.

Houston Alexander was scheduled to fight Andre Gusmao, but was forced to pull out due to a broken hand. Krzysztof Soszynski stepped in to fight Gusmao.

Results

Bonus awards
Fighters were awarded $60,000 bonuses.

Fight of the Night: Hughes vs. Serra
Knockout of the Night: Lyoto Machida
Submission of the Night: Brock Larson

Reported payout
Lyoto Machida: $140,000 (includes $70,000 win bonus) def. Rashad Evans: $200,000
Matt Hughes: $200,000 ($100,000 win bonus) def. Matt Serra: $75,000
Drew McFedries: $34,000 ($17,000 win bonus) def. Xavier Foupa-Pokam: $6,000
Chael Sonnen: $50,000 ($25,000 win bonus) def. Dan Miller: $15,000
Frankie Edgar: $40,000 ($20,000 win bonus) def. Sean Sherk: $40,000
Brock Larson: $42,000 ($21,000 win bonus) def. Mike Pyle: $15,000
Tim Hague: $10,000 ($5,000 win bonus) def. Pat Barry: $7,000
Kyle Bradley: $8,000 ($4,000 win bonus) def. Phillipe Nover: $10,000
Krzysztof Soszynski: $16,000 ($8,000 win bonus) def. Andre Gusmao: $5,000
Yoshiyuki Yoshida: $16,000 ($8,000 win bonus) def. Brandon Wolff: $4,000
George Roop: $16,000 ($8,000 win bonus) def. David Kaplan: $8,000

See also
 Ultimate Fighting Championship
 List of UFC champions
 List of UFC events
 2009 in UFC

References

Ultimate Fighting Championship events
2009 in mixed martial arts
Mixed martial arts in Las Vegas
2009 in sports in Nevada
MGM Grand Garden Arena